The Hagersville Hawks are a Junior ice hockey team from Hagersville, Ontario, Canada.  They are members of the Provincial Junior Hockey League in the Ontario Hockey Association.

History
The Hagersville Hawks were founded in 1992.  The town was previously represented by the Hagersville Flyers of the Niagara & District Junior C Hockey League.  The Hawks won the OHA Cup as league and provincial Junior D champions in 2005.

In the summer of 2012, the Hawks and the entire SOJHL were promoted to Junior C.

Following the 2015-16 season, all the junior "C" hockey leagues united under the Provincial Junior Hockey League.  The Hawks former league stayed together as the Bloomfield Division of the South Conference in the new league.

The playoffs for the 2019-20 season were cancelled due to the COVID-19 pandemic, leading to the team not being able to play a single game.

Season-by-season record

Coaches and GMs
Hagersville has had 10 head coaches and four GM's over their 22 years:
1992-93 Larry Simon (Coach) & Barry Miller (GM).
1993-95 Robin Pepper & Miller (GM).
1995-96 Terry(Ritz) Martin replaces Pepper as coach in mid-season & Miller (GM).
1996-98 Martin (Coach) & Miller (GM).
1998-02 Pat Graham (Coach) & Miller (GM).
2002-06 Todd DeMille (Coach) & Graham (GM).
2006-07 DeMille (Coach & GM).
2007-09 Scott Galbraith (Coach) & DeMille (GM).
2009-?? Derek Bujan (Head Coach) & Demille (GM)
20??-14 Todd DeMille (Head Coach & (GM)
2014-17 Scott Hill (Head Coach) & Demille (GM)
2017-18 Greg Courneyea & Todd DeMille (Head Coach) & Demille (GM)
2018-19 Jamie Page (Head Coach) & Todd DeMille (GM)
2019-?? Todd DeMille (Head Coach & (GM)

External links
Hawks' OHA Webpage

Southern Ontario Junior Hockey League teams
1992 establishments in Ontario
Ice hockey clubs established in 1992